William Hogg Watt (1818–1893) was a 19th-century Member of Parliament in the Manawatu region of New Zealand.

Wellington Provincial Council 
Watt was elected to the Wellington Provincial Council at the 1853 New Zealand provincial elections, representing Wanganui and Rangitikei.

Member of Parliament 

Mayor of Wanganui 

Hogg was elected as the first Mayor of Wanganui in 1872, serving until in 1881 when he was succeeded by Gilbert Carson.

References

1818 births
1893 deaths
New Zealand MPs for North Island electorates
Mayors of Wanganui
Members of the New Zealand House of Representatives
Unsuccessful candidates in the 1884 New Zealand general election
19th-century New Zealand politicians